Hai Chi was a  protected cruiser of the Imperial Chinese Navy. She subsequently served in the Republic of China Navy, before being scuttled in 1937. The hull of the vessel was raised in 1960 and subsequently broken up.

History

Hai Chi was built in 1897 by Armstrong Whitworth in Newcastle upon Tyne.

In 1911, Hai Chi visited the United Kingdom to participate in the fleet review held to mark George V's coronation. It also visited Newcastle for an electrical refitting at Armstrong Whitworth. Due to the occurrence of the Torreón massacre in Mexico, its mission was extended to include a visit to the United States, Cuba and Mexico. On 11 September 1911, she was the first Imperial Chinese Navy vessel in American waters. While the ship was in Cuba, Mexico agreed to Chinese demands for reparations and action against the rebels, and the last leg of the ship's mission was cancelled. Hai Chi sailed home and arrived to a new government, the Republic of China having replaced the Qing empire while the ship was away.

Hai Chi served in the Republic of China Navy thereafter. In 1917 it was part of the fleet which joined Sun Yat-sen's Constitutional Protection Movement against the Beijing government. In 1923 it returned to the north, but in 1926 joined the Fengtian faction of Zhang Zuolin, in Manchuria. After the loss of Manchuria to Japan in the Mukden Incident in 1931, Hai Chi moved to Qingdao along with the rest of the Fengtian navy and became part of the ROC Navy's 3rd Fleet. In 1933, due to a dispute with the fleet commander over pay and expenses, Hai Chi along with two ships travelled south and joined the Guangdong navy. In 1935, due to a dispute with the governor of Guangdong province, Hai Chi together with another ship fought its way past a blockade to reach Hong Kong, and eventually to the capital Nanjing, where (as a compromise) they were nominally returned to the Third Fleet, but in reality came under the direct command of the ministry of defence.

The ship was scuttled as a blockship in the Yangtze River on 11 August 1937 to obstruct the Japanese advance in the Second Sino-Japanese War. Her main guns were dismantled before she was scuttled and installed in the river defences of Wuhan.

References

External links

Hai Chi-class cruisers
1911 in military history
Cruisers of the Beiyang Fleet
Second Sino-Japanese War cruisers of China
1898 ships
Naval ships of China
Maritime incidents in 1937
Shipwrecks of China
Cruisers of Imperial China
Ships built by Armstrong Whitworth
Ships built on the River Tyne
World War II naval ships of China